Little Gull Island Light is a lighthouse on Little Gull Island, a small island in Long Island Sound, located approximately  northeast of Great Gull Island. Both islands are located in the Town of Southold, in Suffolk County, New York, and lie roughly midway between Plum Island and Fishers Island.

History
The lighthouse was automated in 1978 and is still operational. The foundation is a granite pier and the construction material is granite.

In 1813, the light was extinguished by a group of Royal Marines in a raid led by Commodore Thomas Hardy during the War of 1812.

On May 12, 1881, the Galatea, bound from Providence, Rhode Island to New York, ran aground in the calm due to the dense fog.  Two days later, the ship was able to get off the island without damage.  The Lighthouse Board opened an investigation because it was suspected that the fog signal was not operational during that time.  The naval officer in charge of the investigation, French Ensor Chadwick, spent time questioning witnesses and others who might have heard the signal, and tested the signal at various locations around Little Gull Island.  He concluded that the fog signal was operational during the time as the signal was heard at Mystic, Connecticut and by a tug boat that was farther away than the Galatea, and that the aberrations and eccentricities around Little Gull were even more significant than around Beavertail Lighthouse where sound tests were run later in 1881.

The United States Coast Guard has designated Little Gull Island Light as an Historic Light Stations in New York.  

In 2009 Little Gull Island Light was put up for sale under the National Historic Lighthouse Preservation Act. Eight bids up to $381,000 were received. The sale for $381,000 broke the record for the highest bid received to that date under the National Historic Lighthouse Preservation Act.

Little Gull Island Light is shown on the NOAA Chart 12354

In popular culture
The Archives Center at the Smithsonian National Museum of American History has a collection (#1055) of souvenir postcards of lighthouses and has digitized 272 of these and made them available online.  These include postcards of Little Gull Island Light  with links to customized nautical charts provided by National Oceanographic and Atmospheric Administration.

References

External links

 National Park Service
 Long Island Lighthouses article
 Photo of lighthouse

Islands of Suffolk County, New York
Long Island Sound
Southold, New York
Tourist attractions in Suffolk County, New York
Islands of New York (state)
Lighthouses completed in 1806
Towers completed in 1806
Lighthouses completed in 1869
Lighthouses in Suffolk County, New York
1869 establishments in New York (state)